Michel Demuth (1939–2006), born in Lyon, was a French writer, translator and publisher.

1939 births
2006 deaths
French publishers (people)
French science fiction writers
French speculative fiction translators
20th-century French translators
French male novelists
20th-century French novelists
20th-century French male writers
French male non-fiction writers